Linear B Syllabary is a Unicode block containing characters for the syllabic writing of Mycenaean Greek.

Block

History
The following Unicode-related documents record the purpose and process of defining specific characters in the Linear B Syllabary block:

References 

Unicode blocks